The Public Health Institute of Chile (ISP) is an organization that promotes and protects public health in Chile. Since 2019, the ISP has been a member of Vaccine Safety Net (VSN), a global network of websites established by the World Health Organization (WHO).

References 

Healthcare in Chile
World Health Organization
Government health agencies
Establishments in Chile
Organizations based in South America